Carmen-Alida Marcovici  (born ) is a retired Romanian female volleyball player, who played as a middle blocker.

She was part of the Romania women's national volleyball team at the 2002 FIVB Volleyball Women's World Championship in Germany, and 2005 Women's European Volleyball Championship. On club level she played with Boavista Porto.

Clubs
 Boavista Porto (2002)

References

1973 births
Living people
Romanian women's volleyball players
Place of birth missing (living people)